Marvin Alvin Clark (ca. 1852disappeared October 30, 1926) was an American man who disappeared under mysterious circumstances while en route to visit his daughter in Portland, Oregon during the Halloween weekend, 1926. Clark's case has the distinction of being the oldest active missing person case in the United States.

On October 30, 1926, Clark departed his home in Tigard, Oregon to meet his daughter in downtown Portland. He never arrived to meet his daughter, and none of his family made contact with him that day. Some witnesses claimed to have seen Clark at a bus terminal in Portland that day, dressed in a dark suit and slacks. Over a week later, on November 9, Clark's wife Mary received a postcard from Bellingham, Washington, apparently sent from her husband. Several witnesses in the area claimed to have seen him there between November 2 and November 3.

In 1986, a John Doe was discovered in a wooded area between Portland and Tigard; these remains were estimated to have been between 35 and 55 years old at the time of death, and several mementos from the late-19th and early-20th centuries were discovered along with the body, leading detectives to suspect the remains were Clark's. Reports of this potential connection made national headlines in 2011. However, in 2018, it was determined through DNA testing that these remains were not those of Clark. As of 2023, Clark's whereabouts remain unknown.

Timeline

Background
According to U.S. census records, Marvin Clark was born circa 1852 in Marion County, Iowa. Both of Clark's parents were from New York. Clark moved to Oregon with his wife, Mary, as early as 1910; according to the 1910 U.S. Census, he resided in the community of Holbrook. Clark was at one time the town marshal of Linton, a district that would later become part of Portland.

Disappearance
On October 30, 1926, Clark left his home in Tigard around 1 p.m. to visit his daughter, Mrs Sidney McDougall, who was a resident and manager of the Hereford Hotel at 735 Hoyt Street in Northwest Portland. The initial report of Clark's disappearance on November 6, 1926 by The Morning Oregonian stated that he had embarked to Portland by stagecoach, though a report published the following week said he had traveled by bus.

According to sightings,. This was the last reported sighting of him. According to the newspaper reports, Clark suffered from paralysis and could not properly use his right arm; he also walked with a limp, a distinction that police hoped would help elicit sightings of him. His daughter offered a $100 reward for information leading to his discovery.

On November 9, The Bellingham Herald, a newspaper in Bellingham, Washington, reported that Clark's wife, Mary, had received a "disconnected" postcard reportedly written by her husband that was postmarked in Bellingham, and that there had been witnesses who saw Clark at two hotels in the area on November 2 and 3. The news article read: "The letter indicated that the aged man's mind is wandering as it was badly jumbled despite the fact that Clark is highly educated, being a graduate of two universities."

1986 discovery of John Doe
In 1986, nearly sixty years after Clark's disappearance, loggers discovered a nearly complete human skeleton in the woods between Tigard and Portland. Although no identification could be found with the body, an 1888 Liberty Head nickel, a 1919 penny, a pocket watch, leather shoes, and a Fraternal Order of Eagles pocket knife and four tokens with the inscription "D&P" were found near the body. A .38 revolver and a spent shell were also found near the remains. A pair of wire-rimmed glasses were also discovered. Upon an autopsy of the John Doe, the state medical examiner Dr. Karen Gunson observed a bullet hole in the man's skull, and effectively ruled the death a suicide. The estimated age of the John Doe was 35 to 55 years old.

Several days after the discovery, Clark's granddaughter, Dorothy Willoughby, came forward, suspecting the John Doe may have been her missing grandfather, but a positive identification could not be made at the time. Willoughby died in 1991.

Subsequent developments
In 2011, Dr. Niki Vance of the Oregon state medical examiner's office revisited Clark's missing person file, and forensic pathologists were able to retrieve sufficient DNA from the skeletal remains of the John Doe, which had remained in storage since its 1986 discovery. In a 2014 article published by The Oregonian, it was stated that the medical examiners were unable to locate maternal descendants of Clark in order to make a positive identification. "They're looking for a maternal link," said Vance. "Someone on his mother's side, and following that lineage to shore it up. There's an association there but it's not strong at this point."

In 2018, KOIN-TV reported that Pam Knowles, a great-great-granddaughter of Clark, provided DNA samples along with her son to determine whether or not the remains of the John Doe were in fact Clark's. These DNA samples were sent to the University of North Texas for comparison, whereupon it was determined that the remains were not those of Clark. As of 2018, the identity of the John Doe's remains is unknown. The DNA samples provided by Knowles and her son remain on file with the National Missing and Unidentified Persons System database for potential future comparison.

Rian Hakla, a Multnomah County police officer, stated: "If at any point in the future bones are sent in and it's Marvin, we will get a positive identification. And who's to say he won't get found by a hunter or a landscaper or developer or something like that happens. So, there's a chance he could be found."

See also
List of people who disappeared

Notes

References

External links
Marvin Alvin Clark at NamUs
Article on Clark's disappearance at Genealogy Bank

1852 births
1926 in Portland, Oregon
1920s missing person cases
Date of death unknown
History of Portland, Oregon
Missing person cases in Oregon
Law enforcement in Oregon
Year of death missing
October 1926 events